Hatun Luychu (Quechua hatun big, luychu deer, "big deer (mountain)", Hispanicized names Jatumiuicho, Jatumluicho) is a mountain  in the Andes of Peru, about  high. It lies in the Cusco Region, Urubamba Province, on the border of the districts of Chinchero and Hayllabamba, northeast of Chinchero. The mountain southeast of Hatun Luychu is named Wallata Wachana ("where the Andean goose is born", Hispanicized Huallata Huachana)

References

Mountains of Peru
Mountains of Cusco Region